Gum Creek is a stream in Miller County in central Missouri. It is a tributary of the Osage River.

The source area for the stream lies just south of Missouri Route 52 northwest of Tuscumbia. The stream flows southeast crossing under Missouri Route HH before joining the Osage southwest of Tuscumbia.

Gum Creek was so named on account of gum trees near its course.

See also
List of rivers of Missouri

References

Rivers of Miller County, Missouri
Rivers of Missouri